Herbert Fischer (born 16 April 1951 in Trebnitz) is a former East German slalom canoeist who competed in the 1970s. He won a gold medal in the C-2 team event at the 1975 in Skopje.

Fischer also finished 18th in the C-2 event at the 1972 Summer Olympics in Munich.

References
 

1951 births
Living people
People from Teuchern
German male canoeists
Sportspeople from Saxony-Anhalt
Olympic canoeists of East Germany
Canoeists at the 1972 Summer Olympics
Medalists at the ICF Canoe Slalom World Championships